The results of the 2012 Little League World Series were determined between August 16 and August 26, 2012 in South Williamsport, Pennsylvania. 16 teams were divided into two groups, one with eight teams from the United States and another with eight international teams, with both groups playing a modified double-elimination tournament. In each group, the last remaining undefeated team faced the last remaining team with one loss, with the winners of those games advancing to play for the Little League World Series championship. All times shown are US EDT.

Double-elimination stage

United States

Winner's bracket

Game 2: California 6, Connecticut 4

Game 4: Tennessee 12, Nebraska 1

Game 6: Texas 5, New Jersey 2

Game 8: Indiana 4, Oregon 0

Game 14: Tennessee 9, California 6

Game 15: Texas 13, Indiana 3

Game 24: Tennessee 4, Texas 3

Loser's bracket

Game 10: Connecticut 12, Nebraska 0

Game 12: New Jersey 10, Oregon 4

Game 18: California 5, New Jersey 4

Game 20: Connecticut 4, Indiana 0

Game 22: California 5, Connecticut 0

Game 26: California 11, Texas 1

International

Winner's bracket

Game 1: Japan 7, Curaçao 0

Game 3: Chinese Taipei 14, Germany 1

Game 5: Canada 13, Mexico 9

Game 7: Panama 9, Uganda 3

Game 13: Panama 8, Canada 3

Game 16: Japan 2, Chinese Taipei 0

Game 23: Japan 4, Panama 1

Loser's bracket

Game 9: Curaçao 14, Germany 2

Game 11: Mexico 12, MEA 0

Game 17: Curaçao 4, Canada 3

Game 19: Mexico 4, Chinese Taipei 3

Game 21: Mexico 6, Curaçao 2

Game 25: Panama 2, Mexico 1

Crossover games

Game A: Nebraska 17, Germany 1

Game B: Uganda 3, Oregon 2

Single-elimination stage

International Championship: Japan 10, Panama 2

United States Championship: Tennessee 24, California 16

Consolation Game

World Championship Game

References

External links
Full schedule from littleleague.org

2012 Little League World Series